George Diba (born 1 July 1998) is an Israeli professional footballer who plays as a centre-back for Hapoel Acre.

Early life
Diba was born in Marjayoun, Lebanon, to a family of Maronites descent. His parents were fighters in the South Lebanon Army. On 24 May 2000, they emigrated to Israel, following the IDF's withdrawal from Lebanon and settle down in Nahariya.

Club career
On 17 July 2021, Diba signed for three years with Hapoel Tel Aviv.

References

External links
 
 

1998 births
Living people
Israeli footballers
Israeli Maronites
Lebanese Maronites
Maccabi Tzur Shalom F.C. players
Hapoel Acre F.C. players
Hapoel Tel Aviv F.C. players
F.C. Ashdod players
Liga Leumit players
Israeli Premier League players
Footballers from Nahariya
Lebanese emigrants to Israel
Association football central defenders